Shararat – Thoda Jaadu, Thodi Nazaakat ( Mischief – A little magic, a little fun) is an Indian fantasy sitcom which aired on Star Plus channel from 2003 to 2006. The show is loosely based on the American teen sitcom Sabrina the Teenage Witch.

Synopsis
Shararat revolves around Jiya, who is the great-great-great-great-granddaughter of Rani Devi. The show opens on the occasion of Jiya's 18th birthday. Hailing from a family of fairies, Jiya unknowingly becomes the wielder of magical powers. As a result of good deeds by ancestors, her family's first girl child of each generation is blessed with magical powers on turning 18 and so is Jiya.
Jiya lives with her family: her father Dr. Suraj Malhotra, her mother Radha, her brother Jai and her maternal grandmother Sushma. Apart from this, there are Jiya's college friends and acquaintances such as the stud basketball player Dhruv on whom Jiya secretly has a crush. Dhruv returns her ardor, while Parminder (or Pam, as she yells at everybody to call her), the latest NRI entry in the college, threatens Jiya that she will grab all of Dhruv's attention; Meeta her starry-eyed and romantic best friend and Raja, Dhruv's best friend who is always irritated with Meeta running after him. 
Pam is also the niece of Shanti Saberwal the classic neighbor of Malhotra's who is convinced that everything is not normal with the Malhotra household and who always goes there to borrow something or the other. She also has a crush on Suraj. She has a son named Bittu who sometimes teases Jiya's brother Jai.
The Malhotra home with three fairies who use, or rather misuse, their magic nearly always ends up in some trouble. Suraj, who learned on his wedding day that not only his wife but also his mother-in-law is a fairy, has to deal with his mother-in-law who insists that her daughter and granddaughter practice magic for almost everything.
Midway through the series, Bebo, a 10-year-old fairy, is sent to live with the Malhotra family as she is causing mischief everywhere in Paristan, the world of fairies. Normally, a fairy cannot use her magical powers until her 18th birthday, on which Rani Devi sprays a few drops of magical potion on the fairy, thereby releasing all her magical powers. However, Bebo accidentally falls in the entire pot of potion, and that's why she can do magic when other underage fairies cannot.

Due to misunderstandings created by Jiya's duplicate between Jiya and Dhruv, Dhruv is not talking to Jiya. Nani opens Naughty Nani's cafe and also helps Jiya to get her job, a writer. On her job, she impresses her manager with her work and a coworker develops crush on her and starts sending cards to her. Shanti also opens a marriage bureau in Nani's cafe where a man wants to marry Jiya instead of Pam but Jiya is saved by Nani. To help Jiya, Nani gives Shanti and her husband's love to Jiya and Dhruv but this goes wrong and they end up having a fight. Meanwhile, when Jiya thinks that her feelings for Dhruv have changed and she isn't missing him,  Neil Bajaj enters her life with the motive of acquiring the magical powers of three of them (Sushma, Radha, and Jiya). She is smitten by his charm. Elsewhere, when Dhruv gets to know that Jiya is perfectly normal from their broken friendship, he decides to meet her at Nani's cafe where he gets introduced to Neil who challenges Dhruv to win an arm-wrestling match against him. Neil let's Dhruv win the match, thus winning Jiya's heart. Neil informs his boss that their plan to separate Jiya and Dhruv is working as for the first time in life Jiya did not mind Dhruv losing any match. Jiya is confused with her feelings for Neil and Dhruv. Neil even tries to kill Dhruv and snatch Jia's powers but fails. This creates a doubt in the fairies' minds about Neil's intentions. However, Jiya still thinks he is innocent. Later, Sushma and Jiya enter a fairy tale book followed by Radha who plays a modern fairy Godmother, Jiya has to play a character resembling Cinderella, and Pam and Shanti are her step-relatives. She is extremely excited to know that Dhruv is her prince. Meanwhile, Neil uses this opportunity and decides to snatch their magical powers and burn the book. Bebo and Suraj try to stop him but in vain. In the fairy tale, Sushma and Radha's powers become weak and Jia loses consciousness. Prince Dhruv helps them reach the place from where they entered the tale. All three of them make it just in time and are able to save themselves and catch Neil but he escapes the situation by making some excuse. Afterward, he tries to kill Dhruv and gets caught by the fairies. Later, Jiya takes part in World Best Fairy Championship and wins it by giving defeat to Shani Devi and her granddaughter who try to disqualify her.

The Malhotras move into a new house, which is haunted by four stupid but paranoid ghosts: Colonel Pritam Singh, who used to attend Sushma's college and has a crush on her since then; his son Amar Prem, whose life ambition has been to get 1000 customers to make life insurance with him; Amar's wife Pritika, who wants to become a vamp (an antagonistic actress in soap operas); and their son Nidar, who has developed a crush on Jiya. The ghost family had died whilst holidaying in the Malhotra house, and hate the family as they do not want humans to stay at the house, which they now call theirs. They play many pranks on the Malhotras, and the Malhotras in turn use their magic to annoy them, with both parties trying to force the other to leave the house forever. The Malhotra eventually succeeds with the four ghosts attaining salvation and leaving the house. The story ends with Dhruv returning from Australia. He proposes to Jiya and she accepts it. Then, as per the fairy rules they need to get married in 6 hours otherwise they'll not be able to marry each other ever. Jia convinces Suraj for this marriage on the condition that they reveal their true identity of being fairies to Dhruv, who initially gets scared but agrees to marry Jiya. Also Sushma and Jiya promise Suraj that they will never use magic on Dhruv and they seem to keep their promise. But we see that Radha (who ideally never used her powers unless very urgent), uses her spell on Dhruv to make him sink halfway in the ground when he refuses to eat the heavy breakfast made by her thus following Sushma's footsteps of troubling the son-in-law of the family.

Episodes 
 1  Jiya's Magical Transformation  2003-01-24 
 2  Jiya Commits a Blunder  2003-01-31 
 3  Nani Helps Jiya  2003-02-07 
 4  Sushma in Trouble  2003-02-14 
 5  Jiya's Goof-up  2003-02-21 
 6  Nani Punishes Suraj  2003-02-28 
 7  Dadi Visits the Family  2003-03-07 
 8  Nani's Clever Plan  2003-03-14 
 9  Pams Evil Trap  2003-03-21 
 10  The Ladies Lose Their Powers  2003-03-28 
 11  Pam Tricks Jiya  2003-04-04 
 12  Jiya's Truth Powder  2003-04-11 
 13  Nani to the Rescue  2003-04-18 
 14  Jiya's Acting Chance  2003-04-25 
 15  Dhruv to Save Jiya  2003-05-02 
 16  Meet Flirty Riya  2003-05-09 
 17  Jiya Is in a Fix  2003-05-16 
 18  Nanis Ingenious Plan  2003-05-23 
 19  Pams Evil Plan  2003-05-30 
 20  The Gang Supports Jiya  2003-06-06 
 21  Jiya's Triple Threatc  2003-06-13 
 22  Nani Is Punished  2003-06-20 
 23  Jiya's Testing Times  2003-06-27 
 24  Jiya Loses her Powers  2003-07-04 * 25 Jiya's Horrible Day 2003-07-11
 26 Shanti Gets Curious 2003-07-18
 27 Jiya to Reveal her Secret? 2003-07-25
 28 Jiya's Love Letter 2003-08-01
 29 Dhruv Is Put to Test 2003-08-08
 30 Jiya Gets Jealous 2003-08-15
 31 Nani's Sudden Memory Loss 2003-08-22
 32 Jiya vs Jiya 2003-08-22
 33 Suraj's Jadoo Powers 2003-08-29
 34 Nani Is Jealous 2003-09-05
 35 Jiya, the Mediator 2003-09-12
 36 Jay Learns the Secret 2003-09-19
 37 Pam Tricks Dhruv 2003-09-26
 38 Jiya to Celebrate Rose Day 2003-10-03
 39 Rani Devi's Human Avatar 2003-10-10
 40 Rani Devi, Nani Fight 2003-10-17
 41 Jiya Acts in a Play 2003-10-24
 42 Pam Goes Missing 2003-10-31
 43 Nani's Special Advice 2003-11-07
 44 Jiya to Impress Dhruv 2003-11-14
 45 A Surprise for Radha? 2003-11-21
 46 Suraj Is Tortured 2003-11-28
 47 Ghost in the house 2003-12-05
 48 Jiya Learns a Lesson 2003-12-12
 49 Pam's Smart Wish 2003-12-19
 50 Time for New Year Resolutions! 2003-12-26
 51 Jiya, Nani's Time Travel Trip 2004-01-09
 52 Suraj, the Pumpkin 2004-01-16
 53 Jiya's Wrong Move 2004-01-23
 54 Jiya's Pari Finals 2004-01-30
 55 College President Jiya? 2004-02-06
 56 Jiya's V-Day Celebration 2004-02-13
 57 Jiya to Teach Pam a Lesson 2004-02-20
 58 Nani's Magical Typewriter 2004-02-27
 59 Suraj Gains Magical Powers 2004-03-05
 60 Jiya's Time Travel Mishap 2004-03-12
 61 Nani, Jiya's Mix Up 2004-03-19
 62 Dhruv Enters a Boxing Competition 2004-03-26
 63 Jiya's Cupid Spell 2004-04-02
 64 Nani Lost Her Powers? 2004-04-09
 65 Suraj Gets a Special Power 2004-04-16
 66 Jiya's Summer Job 2004-04-23
 67 Jiya Is Distressed 2004-04-30
 68 Jiya's New Job 2004-05-07
 69 Jiya Becomes Responsible 2004-05-14
 70 Trouble in Goa 2004-05-21
 71 Pam, Shanti's Wish 2004-05-28
 72 The Gold Card Mix-up 2004-06-04
 73 Mita in Danger? 2004-06-11
 74 Mita's Diary Confusion 2004-06-18
 75 Jiya's Endless Hunger 2004-06-25
 76 Jiya, Nani's Time Travel Trip 2004-07-02
 77 The Past, Future Collision 2004-07-09
 78 Nani Turns into a Kid 2004-07-16
 79 The Magic of Fears 2004-07-23
 80 Nani's Birthday Party 2004-07-30
 81 Jiya's Magical Mirror 2004-08-06
 82 Jiya, Jai's Weird Situation 2004-08-13
 83 Jiya's Fast Forward Mode 2004-08-20
 84 Jiya Is Attacked 2004-08-27
 85 Jiya Becomes Pam's Slave 2004-09-03
 86 Nani's Stern Decision 2004-09-10
 87 Jiya's Getting Engaged? 2004-09-17
 88 Jiya's Odd Request 2004-09-24
 89 Pam's Pretentious Act 2004-10-01
 90 Nani's Magical Perfume 2004-10-08
 91 Jiya's Lie Detector 2004-10-15
 92 Jiya Spreads Goodwill 2004-10-22
 93 The Gift Thief 2004-10-29
 94 Jiya's Time to Shine 2004-11-05
 95 Rani Devi's Plan 2004-11-12
 96 Bebo, the Naughty Pari 2004-11-19
 97 Bebo in Jiya's College 2004-11-26
 98 Bebo's Mischievous Act 2004-12-03
 99 Jiya Trains Dhruv 2004-12-10
 100 Nani's Discipline Challenge 2004-12-17
 101 Bebo's Christmas Special Magic 2004-12-24
 102 Jiya to Convince Raja 2004-12-31
 103 Bebo's Magic Computer 2005-01-07
 104 Jai, Bebo's New Tutor 2005-01-14
 105 The Bumper Sale Fight 2005-01-28
 106 Jiya's Jadoo ki Jhappi 2005-02-04
 107 Sushma's Valentine 2005-02-11
 108 Suraj or Serial Killer? 2005-02-18
 109 Bebo Fakes an Illness 2005-02-25
 110 Tough Challenge for Dhruv 2005-03-04
 111 Bebo's Magic Cap 2005-03-11
 112 Pam the Bully 2005-03-18
 113 Nani's Holi Party Plan 2005-03-25
 114 Nani's April Fool's Day Prank 2005-04-01
 115 Jiya seeks Cupid's Help 2005-04-08
 116 Bebo's Paristani Fruits 2005-04-15
 117 Jiya to Go to Paristan 2005-04-22
 118 Jiya's Final Exam 2005-04-29
 119 Jiya, Nani Glimpse the Future 2005-05-06
 120 Jiya's Odd Problem 2005-05-13
 121 Suraj, Nani's War 2005-05-20
 122 Jiya's Summer Escape 2005-05-27
 123 Ghost Camp? 2005-06-03
 124 Jiya Is Lost 2005-06-10
 125 Jiya's Magical Blunder 2005-06-17
 126 Nani, the New Chemistry Teacher 2005-07-01
 127 Jiya Plays Supergirl 2005-07-08
 128 Nani Creates Dhruv's Duplicate 2005-07-15
 129 Nani Teaches a Lesson 2005-07-22
 130 Jiya Meets Dumketu 2005-07-29
 131 The "Mummy" Confusion 2005-08-05
 132 Bad Hair Day for Jiya 2005-08-12
 133 Jiya to Help Jay 2005-08-19
 134 A Dracula's Scary Visit 2005-08-26
 135 Jiya in a Trap 2005-09-02
 136 Nani Versus Suraj 2005-09-09
 137 Jiya, Nani in Trouble? 2005-09-16
 138 The Bank Heist Part-I 2005-09-23
 139 The Bank Heist Part-II 2005-09-30
 140 Hunt for Pari's? 2005-10-07
 141 Jiya's Graduation Test 2005-10-14
 142 Duplicate Jiya's Havoc 2005-10-21
 143 Jiya's First Job Interview 2005-10-28
 144 Nani, Jiya's Time Travel 2005-11-04
 145 Nani's New Business 2005-11-11
 146 Jiya's First Day 2005-11-18
 147 Nani's Cafe in Trouble? 2005-11-25
 148 Nani Foresees a Danger 2005-12-02
 149 Dhruv Loses His Memory 2005-12-09
 150 Nani's New Magic Trick 2005-12-16
 151 A Changed Jiya? 2005-12-23
 152 Jiya's New Friend 2005-12-30
 153 Dhruv Moves to Australia? 2006-01-06
 154 Jiya Is Enchanted 2006-01-13
 155 Jiya's 21st Birthday 2006-01-20
 156 Jiya's Family Outing 2006-01-27
 157 Neel's Evil Plan 2006-02-03
 158 Jiya's Valentine 2006-02-10
 159 Jiya Loses Her Powers 2006-02-17
 160 Jiya to Lose her Powers? 2006-02-24
 161 Jiya Uncovers Neel's Secret 2006-03-03
 162 The Ladies Lose their Powers? 2006-03-10
 163 Jiya's Holi Spirit 2006-03-17
 164 Jiya's Fantasy World 2006-03-24
 165 Jiya's Fairytale Ending? 2006-03-31
 166 Neel Harms Dhruv 2006-04-07
 167 Jiya's Boss in Trouble 2006-04-14
 168 Jiya Doubts Adi 2006-04-21
 169 Jiya in World Magic Championships 2006-04-28
 170 Jiya and Laila Clash 2006-05-05
 171 Nani, Radha Train Jiya 2006-05-12
 172 Jiya In Trouble 2006-05-19
 173 Jiya's Judgement Day 2006-05-26
 174 The Malhotras New House 2006-06-02
 175 Ghosts in the Malhotra House 2006-06-09
 176 Jiya, Radha Are Scared 2006-07-21
 177 The Fairies are On a Mission 2006-07-28
 178 Nani Has a Plan 2006-08-04
 179 Malhotras vs Ghosts 2006-08-11
 180 Nani's Magic Blunder 2006-08-18
 181 Jiya's Smart Plan 2006-08-25
 182 Shanti Irritates the Malhotras 2006-09-01
 183 Shani Devi's Revenge 2006-09-15
 184 Nani in Captivity 2006-09-22
 185 Suraj, the Ghosthunter 2006-09-29
 186 Suraj Is Under Pressure 2006-10-06
 187 Nani, Jiya Are Paranoid 2006-10-13
 188 Jiya Liberates Ravan 2006-10-20
 189 The Malhotras Star in a Play 2006-10-27
 190 Yamraj's Plan 2006-11-03
 191 Nani's Masterplan 2006-11-10
 192 Dhurv Proposes to Jiya? 2006-11-17

Cast
Farida Jalal as Sushma Mehra, Radha's mother, Suraj's mother-in-law, Jiya and Jay's maternal grand-mother and 1st Indian Fairy.
Poonam Narula as Radha Malhotra, Suraj's wife, Jiya and Jay's mother, Dhruv's mother-in-law, Sushma's daughter and 2nd Indian Fairy.(2003-2004)
Eva Grover replaced Narula as Radha (2005-2006)
Shruti Seth as Jiya Malhotra, Suraj and Radha's daughter, Jay's elder sister, Sushma's granddaughter and 3rd Indian Fairy.
Mahesh Thakur as Dr.Suraj Malhotra, Radha's husband, Jiya and Jay's father, Dhruv's father-in-law, Sushma's son-in-law, and Mrs. Malhotra's son.
Adnan Jp as Jai Malhotra,  Suraj and Radha's son, Jiya's younger brother, Sushma and Mrs. Malhotra's grandson.
Karanvir Bohra as Dhruv, Jiya's boyfriend, Jay's brother-in-law, Suraj and Radha's son-in-law.
Vaishnavi Sharma as Bebo. An unusually young Fairy from Paristan who entails magical powers equivalent to that of Nani's is fostered by the Malhotra family on Rani Devi's request.
Addite Shirwaikar as Meeta, Jia's best friend and Raja's love interest.
Harsh Vashisht as Raja, Dhruv's best friend, Meeta's love interest. 
Shoma Anand as Shanti Saberwal, Pam's aunt, Monti's mother and wants to marry Suraj so Radha gets jealous.
Simple Kaul as Parminder Sohni alias Pam, Shanti's niece.
Shammi as Rani Devi (2003)
Daisy Irani as Rani Devi, the Queen of Fairyland, the Leader and Creator of Fairies (2003-2006)
Rinku Worah as Eena, Pam's friend.
Maneka Lalwani as Tina, Pam's friend.
Sindhu Parjaat as Lovely, Pam's friend.
Delnaaz Irani as Pritika, Amar Prem's wife, Nidar's mother, Karnal's daughter-in-law, and Bhoot of a new house of Malhotras.
Sooraj Thapar as Amar Prem, Pritika's husband, Nidar's father, Karnal's son, and Bhoot of new house of Malhotras.
Carran Kapoor as Neelabh alias Neel.

Guest appearances
Parikshit Sahni as Khushwant Mehra, Sushma's (Nani) Husband
Karishma Tanna as Natasha
Deepshikha Nagpal as Ria 
Amit Varma as Rocky 
Pushtiie Shakti as Monti's 
Teejay Sidhu as Stella 
Purab Kohli as Dhunketu 
Vishal Malhotra as Ranjha
Kamini Khanna as Suraj's mother
Salil Acharya as Prince
Krishna Bhatt as Thief

Broadcast
The series premiered on 23 January 2003 on Star Plus and concluded on 17 November 2006 after 192 episodes. Reruns of the show also aired on  STAR Utsav, TV Asia, STAR One and Disney Channel India.

Home media and streaming services
The series was made available on Hotstar on 26 June 2019.

References

External links
 
Official Site on STAR Plus

Indian comedy television series
Indian children's television series
2003 Indian television series debuts
2006 Indian television series endings
StarPlus original programming
Sabrina the Teenage Witch
Indian television series based on American television series
Indian television sitcoms
UTV Television
Indian fantasy television series
Television about magic
Television series about witchcraft
Ghosts in television